The avondvierdaagse (four evenings' walk) is an annual Dutch and Surinamese walking event where the participants walk every evening for four days.

History 

In 1909, the term 'vierdaagse' was introduced for the first time in the Netherlands. The Dutch Association for Physical Education (NBLO) organised walking marches in those days. During the Second World War, these 'walking marches' were prohibited by the occupation forces.

Since there was a demand for a walking event in the Gooi area, walks developed under the term 'wandelvierdaagse'. These walks were first held in 1940, and soon caught on in other places in the Netherlands. When occupation forces found out about this new form of walking, they banned the events as assemblies against the occupiers.

After the Second World War, the avondvierdaagse was re-established by various municipalities and local associations. Within a few years, many avondvierdaagsen were being held again. Currently, almost all cities in the Netherlands have such events, and some of these have grown into major events such as the International Four Days Marches Nijmegen (Nijmeegse Vierdaagse).

Distances 
Often, avondvierdaagsen are offered in 2 or 3 distances: typically 5 kilometres, 10 kilometres, and 15 kilometres. The same distance is usually not walked all 4 days, but the total distance usually comes out to average days multiplied by advertised kilometres. In many places, on the last day all participants walk the same distance.

Large walking events (such as the International Four Days Marches Nijmegen) have much greater distances, e.g. 30, 40 or even 50 kilometres.

See also
International Four Days Marches Nijmegen

References

External links

Challenge walks
Sport in the Netherlands
Annual sporting events in the Netherlands
Walking in the Netherlands
Recurring sporting events established in 1909